Adam Mayfield Robinson Jr. (born November 9, 1950) is a United States Navy vice admiral who served as the 36th Surgeon General of the United States Navy (2007–2011).

Biography
Robinson entered the naval service in 1977 and holds a Doctor of Medicine degree from the Indiana University School of Medicine, Indianapolis, through the Armed Forces Health Professions Scholarship Program. Following completion of his surgical internship at Southern Illinois University School of Medicine, Springfield, he was commissioned.

Robinson's first assignment was as a general medical officer, Branch Medical Clinic, Fort Allen, Puerto Rico, before reporting to the National Naval Medical Center, Bethesda, MD, in 1978 to complete a residency in General Surgery. His subsequent duty assignments included: staff surgeon, U.S. Naval Hospital, Yokosuka, Japan, and ship's surgeon, .

After completing a fellowship in colon and rectal surgery at Carle Foundation Hospital, University of Illinois School of Medicine (1984–85), Robinson reported to the National Naval Medical Center, Bethesda, as the head of the Colon and Rectal Surgery Division.

Robinson reported to Naval Medical Center Portsmouth, Virginia, in 1990 as the head of the General Surgery Department and director of General Surgery Residency Program. He was appointed acting medical director for the facility in 1994. While at Naval Medical Center Portsmouth, Robinson earned a Master of Business Administration degree from the University of South Florida. In 1995, Robinson reported to the commander, Naval Surface Force, U.S. Atlantic Fleet, as the force medical officer, serving in that capacity for two years. Following that assignment, he reported to Naval Hospital Jacksonville in 1997 as the executive officer. In January 1999, as Fleet Hospital Jacksonville commanding officer, Robinson commanded a detachment of the fleet hospital as a medical contingent to Joint Task Force Haiti (Operation New Horizon/Uphold Democracy).

In August 1999, Robinson reported to the Bureau of Medicine and Surgery (BUMED) as the director of readiness and was selected as the principal director of clinical and program policy in the Office of the Assistant Secretary of Defense for Health Affairs in September 2000, where he also served as the acting deputy assistant secretary of defense for health affairs, clinical and program policy. Robinson was assigned as commanding officer of U.S. Naval Hospital Yokosuka from September 2001 to January 2004, after which he received assignment back to BUMED as deputy chief of BUMED for medical support operations with additional duty as acting chief of the Medical Corps.  In July 2004, Robinson reported as commander of National Naval Medical Center Bethesda, Maryland.  He assumed the duties as commander of Navy Medicine National Capital Area Region in October 2005.

The author of numerous presentations and publications, Robinson holds fellowships in the American College of Surgeons and the American Society of Colon and Rectal Surgery. He is a member of the Le Societe Internationale de Chirurgie, the Society of Black Academic Surgeons, and the National Business School Scholastic Society, Beta Gamma Sigma. He holds certification as a Certified Physician Executive from the American College of Physician Executives.

Military awards
U.S. Military decorations

See also
Medical Corps (United States Navy)

References

U.S. Navy biography of Adam M. Robinson Jr.
Biography of Vice Admiral Adam M. Robinson at Navy Medicine

United States Navy admirals
Living people
Indiana University School of Medicine alumni
Southern Illinois University alumni
1950 births
Recipients of the Legion of Merit
Recipients of the Navy Distinguished Service Medal
Recipients of the Meritorious Service Medal (United States)
Military personnel from Louisville, Kentucky
Surgeons General of the United States Navy